Imperator rhodopurpureus is an inedible fungus of the genus Imperator, found under deciduous trees including oak and beech in neutral soils. Initially described as Boletus rhodopurpureus, it was transferred to the new genus Imperator in 2015. The bolete is considered critically endangered in the Czech Republic.

Description 
The cap is cushion-like, up to 15 cm in diameter; faint yellow- or pink-buff when young, later flushing red from the rim and becoming blotched with yellow, red and olivaceous tones.
The tubes are orange or red at first, then turning dark blue when cut. The spores are olive-brown. The stem is rather short, and sometimes very bulbous. The flesh is pale yellow, turning blue when cut.

Similar species 
In the warmest regions of central and southern Europe the blood red-capped Rubroboletus dupainii.

References 
 E. Garnweidner. Mushrooms and Toadstools of Britain and Europe. Collins. 1994.

External links 
 
 

Fungi described in 1952
Fungi of Europe
Boletaceae